The 2000 Canadian Professional Soccer League season was the third season under the Canadian Professional Soccer League name. The season began on May 26, 2000 and concluded on October 1, 2000 with Toronto Croatia   defeating Toronto Olympians 2-1 to claim their first CPSL Championship (known as the Primus CPSL Cup for sponsorship reasons). The final was hosted at Cove Road Stadium for the first time. Throughout the season, all eight clubs from the previous year returned, while the Olympians secured their third straight regular season title. The league received sponsorship from Primus Canada, which granted Primus naming rights to the CPSL Championship, and Vincent Ursini was appointed the CPSL Chairman.

Teams

Final standings

Primus Canada CPSL Championship playoffs 
The top four teams qualified for a one-game semifinal that led to the championship game played on October 1 at Cove Road Stadium in London, Ontario.

Wildcard

Semifinals

Primus CPSL Championship

2000 scoring leaders
Full article: CSL Golden Boot

CPSL Executive Committee 
The 2000 CPSL Executive Committee.

Individual awards
The annual CPSL awards ceremony was held on October 1, 2000 after the CPSL Championship final at the German Canadian Club in London, Ontario. Where for the second straight season the Toronto Olympians went home with the most awards with 3 wins. Kouzmanis became the first player to win the Golden Boot more than once and continues to hold that distinction. Olympian veteran Bayete Smith was named the Defender of the Year for his contribution for helping the club achieve the best defensive record. Their final award was their second straight Fair Play award for being the most disciplined team throughout the season.

The league chose former NPSL and USL A-League veteran Willy Giummarra of the York Region Shooters as its MVP. The Goalkeeper of the Year was given to Piotr Libicz, a former NPSL and CNSL veteran. After managing the St. Catharines Roma Wolves to second place finish behind Toronto with only a lower goal differential Lucio Ianiero was chosen as the Coach of the Year. Jimmy Kuzmanovski of the Oshawa Flames broke London City's four year hold on the Rookie of the Year award. For his efforts Steve Cahoon went home with the Referee of the Year award.

References

External links
Rocket Robin's Home Page of the 2000 CPSL Season

2000
2000 domestic association football leagues
Canadian Professional Soccer League